Mark Rogers (born November 3, 1975) is a Canadian soccer coach and former player. He represented Canada as a member of the national team. Rogers was born in Guelph, Ontario.

Club career
While at university in Vancouver, Rogers played for Burnaby Canadians. In February 1999 he signed for Wycombe Wanderers after initially being refused a work permit. He had five seasons with the Chairboys, then played on loan for Stevenage Borough for whom he signed permanently in April 2004. In 2005, he retired at 30 years of age, due to knee and back injuries.

International career
He made his debut for Canada in an October 2000 World Cup qualification match against Panama and went on to earn a total of 7 caps, scoring no goals. He has represented Canada in 1 FIFA World Cup qualification match. He played at the 2002 CONCACAF Gold Cup. He did score an own goal in this tournament against Martinique.

His final international was a November 2003 friendly  match against the Republic of Ireland.

Rogers left his role as head coach of the University of British Columbia Women's Soccer Team in 2010 and accepted the role of Interim Assistant Coach for the Canadian Men's National Team, working under Colin Miller. Rogers is currently the Technical Director of South Delta United Soccer Club.

References

External links
  (archive)
 
 
 
 

1975 births
Living people
Sportspeople from Guelph
Soccer people from Ontario
Association football defenders
Canadian soccer players
Canada men's international soccer players
Canadian expatriate soccer players
Wycombe Wanderers F.C. players
Stevenage F.C. players
English Football League players
University of British Columbia alumni
Expatriate footballers in England
2002 CONCACAF Gold Cup players
UBC Thunderbirds soccer players
Canadian expatriate sportspeople in England